Coelioxys inermis  is a Palearctic species of sharp-tailed bee.

References

External links
Images representing  Coelioxys inermis

Hymenoptera of Europe
Megachilidae
Insects described in 1802